Khowai Government Higher Secondary School is located at Khowai, a town in Tripura. It is situated near Subhash park. It is a Tripura Board of Secondary Education affiliated Government school. The school offers courses from the 6th standard till the 12th standard.

See also
Education in India
Education in Tripura

References 

 Educrats website 
Khowai Government Higher Secondary School

External links
Official site of Khowai

High schools and secondary schools in Tripura
Khowai district
Educational institutions established in 1933
1933 establishments in India